Al Hadatha (Arabic: مجلة الحداثة) is a refereed academic cultural quarterly magazine that has been published in Beirut, Lebanon, since 1994 based on a license from the Ministry of Information. Since its first issue, the journal has been concerned with publishing academic research after it has been submitted to a specialized scientific committee.

References

External links

1994 establishments in Lebanon
Arabic-language magazines
Cultural journals
Magazines published in Beirut
Publications established in 1994
Quarterly journals